Pymmes House was a house built by William Pymme in 1327 in what is now Pymmes Park, in Edmonton, London. It had a succession of notable owners, particularly in the Elizabethan period and was remodelled and rebuilt several times. It was demolished after a fire in 1940.

History

The first Pymmes House was built by William Pymme in 1327, a landowner in Edmonton, now in London, and member of the Pymme family who had been granted land by Edward II in the 14th century.

It was sited on the north side of Watery Lane in Edmonton, now known as Silver Street. The house was subsequently occupied by a number of notable individuals including Thomas Wilson (1524–1581), William Cecil, 1st Baron Burghley (1520–1598), and Robert Cecil, 1st Earl of Salisbury (c. 1563 – 1612).

In the late 19th century the house was owned by Sir Henry Tyler, member of Parliament and railway director. From 1875 till 1878 it was the home of the Nawab of Bengal and his Family.

It was significantly remodelled more than once but demolished after a fire in 1940 that is not thought to have been the result of Second World War bombing. The grade II listed garden walls still exist in Pymmes Park.

References

External links 

Houses in the London Borough of Enfield
Buildings and structures demolished in 1940
Buildings and structures in the United Kingdom destroyed during World War II
Buildings and structures completed in 1327
History of Middlesex
Demolished buildings and structures in London